Live in Munich is a DVD release of a concert by American jazz musician Miles Davis, recorded on 10 July 1988 in the Gasteig in Munich, Germany.

References

Concert films
Miles Davis